Tempest is a 2015 independent animation short film directed, animated and written by Saatvik Arya. The film was completed by Saatvik Arya at the age of 14 years.

Tempest held its US premiere on March 21, 2015 at the School Daze Movie Fest in Oregon, United States. As of December 2015, it has been accepted in competition by more than 15 international film festivals including Gold Coast International Film Festival 2015, ENIMATION Little Elephant - International Children and Youth Film Festival, Slovenia and YOUKI-International Youth Media Festival, Austria.

Premise 
After being struck by lightning during a super-storm, two teenagers must decide how to use their newly gained superpowers: For good, or for evil.

Official Selections and Screenings

References

External links 
 Official Facebook Page
 Tempest at ENIMATION Little Elephant, Slovenia
 Tempest at Awareness Film Festival 2015

2010s animated short films
2015 animated films
2015 films
Indian animated short films
2010s English-language films